Renuka lake is in the Sirmaur district of Himachal Pradesh in India and it is 672 m above the sea level. It is the largest lake in Himachal Pradesh, with a circumference of about 3214 m. This lake was named after the goddess Renuka and is designated as Ramsar site since November 2005.

Location 
Distance from Parwanoo: 123 km.
Distance from Paonta Sahib: via Sataun 51 km
Distance from Nahan: 38 km.

Legend 

On the eve of Prabodhini Ekadashi, a five-day Renuka fair begins with the religious observance of the arrival of Renuka's son, Parashurama, to the Renuka lake in Himachal, believed to be the goddess' abode. Devotees from all over the country arrive to observe the meeting of the mother and son.

According to the Puranas, the Renuka Tirtha is considered as the birthplace of Parashurama, the sixth incarnation of Vishnu. Maharishi Jamadagni and his wife Renuka are regarded to have meditated for long time at a hillock known as Tape Ka Tiba near the Renuka lake. With the blessings of Shiva, Vishnu is believed to have been born as their son. 

According to local tradition, after the death of Jamadagni after he refused to part with the divine cow, Kamadhenu, Renuka is regarded to have jumped into the lake to take her own life. The lake is said to have assumed the form of a woman, after which it was called the Renuka lake. When Parashurama arrived at the lake to pray to his mother to return, Renuka is believed to have told him that while she had assumed the lake as her residence, she would make her presence known during the occasion of Prabodhini Ekadashi, when she would meet him and bless her adherents.

One day advance, on dashami, the palanquin of Parashurama is brought to Renuka from the ancient temple in Jamu Koti village in a traditional procession known a ‘Shobha Yatra’, attended by lakhs of devotees.

Sanctuary 

The sanctuary is situated in Sirmour district in Himachal Pradesh. The sanctuary is well connected by the network of motorable roads. The total area of the sanctuary is about 4.028 km². The entire sanctuary consists of Renuka Reserve Forest and has been declared as Abhayaranya. An area of roughly about 3 km² that lies outside the sanctuary has been declared as a buffer belt.

The sanctuary falls in the biogeographical zone IV and biogeographical province IV as per the classification done by the Wildlife Institute of India (WII). According to forest types classification, the area falls under group 5B/C2, i.e., dry mixed deciduous forest and group 5/051, i.e., dry sal forest.

Threats 

The lake is threatened by continuously shrinking size. The silt which is being deposited in the lake is causing a worry to the locals and the administration. The main cause of this is the soil being deposited on the banks, with the rain water and landslides in the nearby mountains. Also the waste of construction material is being dumped into the lake for years, which is a big threat to the environment. Administration and Renuka Vikas Smiti are trying their best to protect the lake. Plastic bags are banned in the entire region.

Gallery

References

See also
 Bhakra Dam
 Kishau Dam
 Lakhwar Dam

Citations

External links

 
 Renuka lake Himachal 
 himachaltourism.nic.in
 hptdc.gov.in
 http://www.ramsar.org/renuka-wetland

Lakes of Himachal Pradesh
Geography of Sirmaur district
Ramsar sites in India
Renuka